The Golden Anniversary State Forest is a state forest located near Grand Rapids in southern Itasca County, Minnesota. The forest was established in 1961 in celebration of the golden anniversary of the Minnesota Department of Natural Resources's Division of Forestry, which is responsible for the management of the majority of the state forests in Minnesota.

Flora and fauna
An abundance of wildlife is present in the forest with its variety of tree species, namely aspen, Northern Whitecedar, northern hardwoods, White Spruce, Balsam Fir, Red Pine, and Eastern White Pine. Management efforts in the forest are currently working towards creating more habitat for Ruffed Grouse. White-tailed deer are common in the forest and have established a deer yard near Cowhorn Lake, where waterfowl species are also present.

Recreation
Outdoor recreational activities include hunting, picnicking, and backcountry camping. A boat launch makes Cowhorn Lake accessible for fishing, as well as swimming.

See also
List of Minnesota state forests

References

External links
Golden Anniversary State Forest - Minnesota Department of Natural Resources (DNR)

Minnesota state forests
Protected areas of Itasca County, Minnesota
Protected areas established in 1961